Donald Stovel Macdonald  (March 1, 1932 – October 14, 2018) was a Canadian lawyer, politician and diplomat. Macdonald was a long-time Liberal party Member of Parliament and Cabinet minister. In the early 1980s, he headed a royal commission (the Macdonald Commission) which recommended that Canada enter a free trade agreement with the United States.

Early life and education
Macdonald was born in Ottawa, Ontario. He graduated from the University of Trinity College in the University of Toronto in 1952. He subsequently attended Harvard Law School (LLM), as well as the University of Cambridge in England (Diploma in International Law).

Political career
He was first elected to the House of Commons of Canada in the 1962 election as the Liberal Member of Parliament for the Rosedale riding in Toronto. In 1967, he was the parliamentary secretary of Paul Martin, Secretary of State for External Affairs. He joined the Cabinet of Pierre Trudeau in 1968 and served successively as President of the Privy Council, Minister of National Defence, Minister of Energy, Mines and Resources and Minister of Finance. As Finance Minister, Macdonald introduced tougher Employment insurance rules in his 1976 budget, and wage and price controls in an attempt to control inflation in his 1977 budget.

Macdonald resigned from Cabinet in 1977 to return to his law practice. When Pierre Trudeau announced his resignation as leader of the Liberal Party of Canada following his defeat in the 1979 election, Macdonald would have declared his candidacy for the position. However, with the unexpected defeat of Joe Clark's Progressive Conservative government on a motion of no confidence, the Liberals asked Trudeau to lead them into the 1980 election and cancelled the leadership campaign. Macdonald was not a candidate for the party leadership when Trudeau resigned again in 1984.

Subsequent career
In 1982, Prime Minister Trudeau appointed Macdonald as chairman of a Royal Commission on the Economic Union and Development Prospects for Canada (the Macdonald Commission). The report was released in September 1985 and recommended, among other things, that Canada enter into a free trade agreement with the United States. Progressive Conservative Brian Mulroney was Prime Minister by this time. He accepted the recommendation and pursued what became the Canada–US Free Trade Agreement.

Macdonald was appointed High Commissioner of Canada to the United Kingdom in 1988. He held that position until 1991, when he returned to his law practice in Toronto. He is also a past member of the Steering Committee of the Bilderberg Group.

Honours and awards
In 1994, Macdonald was made a Companion of the Order of Canada. He received honorary degrees from the Colorado School of Mines, the University of New Brunswick, Carleton University, and the University of Toronto (Doctor of Sacred Letters, Trinity College, University of Toronto).

Personal life
Macdonald married Ruth Hutchison (dec.) in 1961, and their four daughters are Leigh, Nikki, Althea, and Sonja. Nikki Macdonald served as a senior advisor to Jean Chrétien during his time as Prime Minister.

In 1988, he married Adrian Merchant Lang, the daughter of Sally Merchant. From her prior marriage to Otto Lang, she had seven children: Maria (d. 1991), Timothy, Gregory, Andrew, Elisabeth, Adrian, and Amanda Lang. They have fifteen grandchildren.

Macdonald died at his home in Toronto on October 14, 2018.

Electoral record

Archives 
There is a Donald Stovel MacDonald fonds at Library and Archives Canada.

References

Further reading

External links
 
 

1932 births
2018 deaths
Canadian Baptists
Canadian Ministers of Finance
Defence ministers of Canada
Companions of the Order of Canada
Liberal Party of Canada MPs
Members of the House of Commons of Canada from Ontario
Members of the King's Privy Council for Canada
Members of the Steering Committee of the Bilderberg Group
Politicians from Ottawa
Politicians from Toronto
Trinity College (Canada) alumni
University of Toronto alumni
High Commissioners of Canada to the United Kingdom
Harvard Law School alumni
Alumni of the University of Cambridge
20th-century Baptists